SC Bacău can refer to two Romanian football teams.

 FCM Bacău – named SC Bacău between 1970–1990.
 ACS Gauss Bacău – named SC Bacău between 2010–2017.

ro:SC Bacău